Epichloë liyangensis is a hybrid asexual species in the fungal genus Epichloë. 

A systemic and seed-transmissible grass symbiont first described in 2011,  Epichloë liyangensis is a natural allopolyploid of Epichloë bromicola and a strain from the Epichloë typhina complex (from Poa nemoralis).

Epichloë liyangensis is found in Asia, where it has been identified in the grass species Poa pratensis subsp. pratensis.

References

liyangensis
Fungi described in 2011
Fungi of Asia